On 2 December 1979, the U.S. Embassy in Tripoli, Libya, was burned during protests over allegations that the United States was involved in the Grand Mosque seizure in Mecca, Saudi Arabia.

The United States had already withdrawn the U.S. Ambassador to Libya in 1972. Following the 1979 attack, all remaining U.S. government personnel were withdrawn and the embassy closed. Diplomatic presence resumed on February 8, 2004 with the arrival of the U.S. Interests Section in Tripoli. That mission was upgraded to a Liaison Office on June 24, 2004.

Sources

Office of the Spokesman Upgrading of Diplomatic Relations with Libya U.S. Department of State. May 15, 2006.

See also
1979 U.S. embassy burning in Islamabad

Libya–United States relations
1979 in Libya
1979 in the United States
1979 in international relations
Attacks on diplomatic missions of the United States
Attacks on diplomatic missions in Libya
20th century in Tripoli, Libya